Anne-Katrin Purkiss is a photographer, born in Karl-Marx-Stadt, Germany in 1959 and moving to Britain in 1984 after graduating from University of Leipzig in 1983. Her father Joachim Seyffarth (1928-2014) was a German curator of monuments and photographer.

Her Sculptors project  documented sculptors in their working environment and includes portraits of Dame Elisabeth Frink, Kenneth Armitage, Andy Goldsworthy, Sir Anthony Caro and Lynn Chadwick.

A collection of her portraits of British scientists is held by the Royal Society and was shown in part in a display at the National Portrait Gallery, London including portraits of Sir Alec Jeffreys,  Lord Darzi, Sir Martin Evans, Sir Tim Hunt and Dame Louise Johnson.

She compiled photographic records of the restoration of the Watts Gallery in Compton, Surrey, between 2008 and 2011, J.M.W. Turner’s House Sandycombe Lodge in Twickenham, London, from 2016 to 2017 and Gainsborough's House in Sudbury, Suffolk, from 2014 to 2022.
 
Her early work includes a large number of photographs of her childhood and youth in the GDR (East Germany) which is catalogued in the Deutsche Nationalbibliothek (German National Library).

She works primarily in black-and-white, using available light and Hasselblad.

Works in public collections
There are over 100 photographic portraits by Purkiss in the National Portrait Gallery collection including portraits of Denis Thatcher, Enoch Powell, Simon Rattle and Georg Solti. Her work is also held in the collections of the Library of the Royal Academy of Arts, the Royal Society, London, the Henry Moore Institute, Leeds, the New Hall Art Collection, University of Cambridge, the Ingram Collection, in the archive of TATE, the National Art Library and the library of Yale Centre for British Art.

Publications
Local  Faces (2001) Orleans House Gallery (with introductions by Bamber Gascoigne and Terence Pepper)  
Sculptors 1986-2007 (2007) Orleans House Gallery  (with an introduction by Victoria Worsley, Henry Moore Institute)
Images of the GDR akg-images (Berlin–London–Paris) (2009) 
Scientists 1985-2010 (2010) 
Artists at Home and at Work (2015) The Gainsborough's House Society 
Faces of the South Downs - Portraits of a Landscape (2015) Miriquidi Books  
Sculptors 1986-2016 (2017) Miriquidi Books ; foreword by Peter Murray (Yorkshire Sculpture Park) and Adrian Glew, archivist at Tate Gallery
Anthony Eyton - Studio pictures (2017) Miriquidi Books 
Creative Connections – Portraits of Women Scientists and Artists (2019), Murray Edwards College, University of Cambridge 
Sculptors at Work (2021) F.E.McWilliam Gallery & Studio 
Gainsborough’s House – Reviving an Artist’s Birthplace (2023) Gainsborough’s House Society

Illustrations to publications
 Oxford Dictionary of National Biography, (current edition)
 Poland – European Tiger, Euromoney Books 1993 
 Finland – A Coming of Age, Euromoney  Books, 1996 
 The lost Palace of Whitehall,  RIBA, 1998 
 Postman's Park: G. F. Watts's Memorial to Heroic Self-Sacrifice Watts Gallery, 2008 
 Watts Chapel: A Guide to the Symbols of Mary Watts's Arts and Crafts Masterpiece, Philip Wilson Publishers, 2010, 
 An Artists’ Village, Philip Wilson Publishers, 2011, 
 Paolo Cavinato – Constellation, Royal British Society of Sculptors, 2011 
 SKULPTUR, Hatje Cantz, 2015 
 Secrets of the High Woods, South Downs National Park Authority, 2016 
 Sculpture Shock - Site-specific interventions, Black Dog Publishing, 2016 
 J.M.W. Turner’s House - The conservation of Sandycombe Lodge in Twickenham, 2016/17, Turner’s House Trust, 2017 
 John Hitchens - Aspects of Landscape, Sansom & Company, Bristol 2020 
 Diana Armfield: A Lyrical Eye, Paul Holberton Publishing 2021 
 CONVERGENCE – Paintings by John Hitchens, Felix & Spear, London, 2022

Portraits of Purkiss
The National Portrait Gallery collection has a 1994 print of Purkiss by Alan Symes.

References

External links
Homepage of Anne-Katrin Purkiss photography website
2021 Online exhibition on Google Arts
 

German women photographers
East German photographers
East German women
1959 births
Living people
People from Chemnitz
Photographers from Saxony
21st-century German photographers
German emigrants to the United Kingdom
20th-century women photographers
21st-century women photographers
20th-century German women
21st-century German women